Dieter Danzberg (12 November 1940 – 28 December 2019) was a German professional footballer who played as a defender.

Career
Born in Duisburg, Danzberg began his career with hometown club MSV, later playing with FC Bayern Munich, Rot-Weiß Oberhausen, Freiburger FC and Eintracht Gelsenkirchen.

Later life and death
In 2009 he was diagnosed with Alzheimer's disease; in 2012 he moved into a nursing home in Dorsten, where he lived until his death at the age of 79 in December 2019.

References

1940 births
2019 deaths
German footballers
MSV Duisburg players
FC Bayern Munich footballers
Rot-Weiß Oberhausen players
Freiburger FC players
STV Horst-Emscher players
Bundesliga players
Association football defenders
Deaths from dementia in Germany
Deaths from Alzheimer's disease
Footballers from Duisburg